Ron Fish is an American musician and recording artist. He was drummer for Dick Dale, a surf guitarist of the 1960s. He was one of four composers to contribute songs to the soundtrack of the acclaimed video game God of War and its sequels. He worked as a Disney Imagineer for eight years and was involved with the virtual reality Disney Quest attraction. His video game soundtrack work also includes Batman: Arkham Asylum, Batman: Arkham City, Rise of Nightmares and Batora: Lost Haven.

References

Dick Dale and the Del-Tones members
Surf musicians
Living people
Year of birth missing (living people)
Place of birth missing (living people)
American rock drummers